2015 WTA Elite Trophy doubles was a doubles tennis competition held as part of the 2015 WTA Elite Trophy tournament. 2015 was the event's first year. Liang Chen and Wang Yafan won the title, defeating Anabel Medina Garrigues and Arantxa Parra Santonja in the final, 6–4, 6–3.

Players

Draw

Final

Group A

Group B

References

Doubles Draw

2015
Elite Trophy
2015 in Chinese tennis